Tarporley Urban District is a former subdivision of Cheshire, England. Established in 1894, it functioned until 1936 when it was absorbed into Northwich Rural District.

References 
http://discovery.nationalarchives.gov.uk/details/c/F195629

1894 establishments in England
1936 disestablishments in England
Former districts of Cheshire
States and territories disestablished in 1936
States and territories established in 1894
Tarporley